Andragathius was the Magister equitum of Magnus Maximus. He captured and murdered the Roman Emperor Gratian in 383, between Lyons and Grenoble. Andragathius threw himself into the ocean following the defeat of Maximus. 'Dux' contends that Andragathius' position under Maximus was like that of Arbogast in his service to Eugenius.

Maximus sent Andragathius to search for the mother of Valentinian when he learned that she was crossing the Ionian Sea with her children. Andragathius failed to locate her, though he sailed with a number of fast ships in every direction. The woman and her companions had beaten them to the Ionian Strait, which they crossed. Andragathius brought together a competent navy which sailed the adjacent coasts, in anticipation of an attack by Theodosius.

Prior to killing Gratian, Andragathius hid  himself in a litter which looked similar to a couch. The litter was carried by mules.  He ordered his guards to send out a report that the litter contained the wife of Gratian.

References

4th-century Romans
Ancient Roman military personnel who committed suicide
Magistri equitum (Roman Empire)
Regicides